The Asian Art Museum of San Francisco – Chong-Moon Lee Center for Asian Art and Culture is a museum in San Francisco, California that specializes in Asian art.  It was founded by Olympian Avery Brundage in the 1960s and has more than 18,000 works of art in its permanent collection, some as much as 6,000 years old. Its logo is an upside down letter A, which also looks like a letter V with a line through it.

History
The museum origin stems from a donation to the city of San Francisco by Chicago millionaire Avery Brundage, who was a major collector of Asian art. The Society for Asian Art, incorporated in 1958, was the group that formed to gain Brundage's collection. The museum opened in 1966 as a wing of the M. H. de Young Memorial Museum in Golden Gate Park. Brundage continued to make donations to the museum, including the bequest of all his remaining personal collection of Asian art on his death in 1975. In total, Brundage donated more than 7,700 Asian art objects to San Francisco.

Despite Brundage's professed goal of creating a “bridge of understanding” between the U.S. and Asia, a deeper insight into his actions revealed that he held racist, sexist, and anti-Semitic beliefs that entirely contradicted the mission and values of the museum. In 2020, the museum removed a statue of Brundage from its lobby where it had stood for five decades, and launched a thorough re-examination of his controversial legacy.  Museum director Jay Xu wrote that Brundage “espoused racist and anti-Semitic views.”

The museum was awarded the Japanese Foreign Minister’s Commendation for their contributions to promotion of cultural exchange through art between Japan and the United States on December 1, 2020.

Jay Xu is the museum's director.

Relocation
Until 2003, the museum shared a space with the de Young Museum in Golden Gate Park. As the museum's collection grew, the facilities in Golden Gate Park were no longer sufficient to display or even house the collection.  In 1987 Mayor Dianne Feinstein proposed a plan to revitalize Civic Center that included relocating the museum to the Main Library. In 1995, Silicon Valley entrepreneur Chong-Moon Lee made a $15 million donation to launch the funding campaign for a new building for the museum.

During its last year in the park, it was closed for the purpose of moving to its new location. It reopened on March 20, 2003, in the former San Francisco city library building opposite of the San Francisco Civic Center, which was renovated for the purpose, under the direction of Italian architect Gae Aulenti. Lord Cultural Resources, a cultural professional practice, was also commissioned to undertake a three-part sequence of planning studies for the relocation of the museum.

The old Main library was a Beaux Arts-style building designed by George Kelham in 1917. The new $160.5 million project, designed by Gae Aulenti, introduced an indoor sky-lit court to provide a dramatic central core to the museum.  Removing some interior walls, Aulenti created a sense of openness to facilitate visitor movement and the display of the artwork.  The new  museum increased the exhibition space by approximately 75 percent compared to the former Golden Gate Park location.

The renovation also brought a seismic upgrade scheme to the building involving base isolation. Bearings were placed over the foundation system below the building's current slab on grade with a new basement  constructed above the bearings in the process. Furthermore, the superstructure was stiffened through the addition of concrete shear walls, allowing for a rigid lateral load path for all sections of the building.

In October 2011, the museum launched a new identity. Designed by the branding agency Wolff Olins, the logo is an upside down A, representing the idea of approaching Asian art from a new perspective.

Expansion
In March 2016, the museum announced that it would build an additional new pavilion to its San Francisco Civic Center Building. The new pavilion will sit atop an existing, lower-level wing on the museum's Hyde Street side; and it will add about 9,000 square feet of new space to the museum's first floor. The expansion is expected to open by September 2019. In January 2019, Abby Chen was appointed as the Head of Contemporary Art.

Collection
The collection has approximately 18,000 works of art and artifacts from all major Asian countries and traditions, some of which are as much as 6,000 years old. Galleries are devoted to the arts of South Asia, Iran and Central Asia, Southeast Asia, the Himalayas, China, Korea and Japan. There are more than 2,000 works on display in the museum galleries.

The museum has become a focus for special and traveling exhibitions, including: the first major Chinese exhibition to travel outside China since the end of World War II (in 1975), an archaeological exhibition which attracted 800,000 visitors over an eight-week period, and an exhibition on wisdom and compassion opened by the Dalai Lama in 1991.

Galleries

Tea House
A  Japanese tea house is displayed on the second exhibition floor of the museum. This teahouse was built in Kyoto, disassembled, shipped to San Francisco and reconstructed in the museum by Japanese carpenters.  The name of the tea house can be seen on a wooden plaque "In the Mist" located next to the Tea House on the second floor of the museum, The calligraphy on this wooden plaque is based on the calligraphy by Yamada Sobin and commissioned by Yoshiko Kakudo, the museum's first curator of Japanese art. The Tea House was designed by architect Osamu Sato as a functioning teahouse, as well as a display case. It is a three and three-quarters (sanjo daime) mat room. It is complete with an alcove for the display of a scroll and flowers, an electric-powered sunken hearth used in winter for the hot water kettle, and a functioning preparation area (mizuya) with fresh running water and drain.

See also

49-Mile Scenic Drive
List of museums with major collections of Asian art

References

External links

Official website

Asian-American culture in San Francisco
Art museums and galleries in San Francisco
Civic Center, San Francisco
Institutions accredited by the American Alliance of Museums
Asian art museums in California
1966 establishments in California
Art museums established in 1966
1966 in San Francisco